Harpos Football Club, known as Harpos FC, is an American amateur soccer club based in Boulder, Colorado who play in the United States Adult Soccer Association. The team, founded by former undergraduates of the University of Colorado, has won 31 trophies since 2008 including the Breckenridge Tournament, City of Boulder, Colorado Premier League, Copa Alianza Denver, Premier Arena Soccer League Rocky Mountain Division, USSSA Colorado State Cup and Vail Invitational Tournament.

History 
The club reached the second round of the 2015 Lamar Hunt U.S. Open Cup, defeating BYU Cougars in a shootout 4–2 in the first round. The team lost to Colorado Springs Switchbacks 2–1 in the second round.

In 2016 HFC again reached the second round of the 2016 Lamar Hunt U.S. Open Cup, defeating Albuquerque Sol FC 2–0 in the first round. In the second round, HFC lost to Colorado Springs Switchbacks 1–0.

In mid-2019, the club partnered with another local side, FC Boulder, and began to incorporate its brand into the former's programming and logo. Later that year, the newly named "FC Boulder Harpos" took part in the 2020 U.S. Open Cup Qualification tournament. In November, the team won its third round match against Colorado Rovers S.C. to qualify for the final tournament.

In 2020, the partnership with FC Boulder concluded, in part due to the Covid global pandemic, and the club became Harpos FC again. 

In 2021, Harpos FC joined the United States Adult Soccer Association USASA and will play in the newly minted best competition in the state, Colorado Super League. Harpos FC is awaiting word from U.S. Soccer on being selected (or not) as one of the 24 (instead of 101 teams), who will compete in the abbreviated version of the 107th Lamar Hunt U.S. Open Cup.

References 

Harpos Football Club
Association football clubs established in 1997